Thayanur, Tiruchirappalli district, India. 
 Thayannur, Kasaragod district, India.